The 2008–09 Austrian Cup (also Stiegl-Cup for sponsoring purposes) was the 75th season of Austria's nationwide football cup competition. It started on July 18, 2008 with the first game of the preliminary round. The final was held at the Pappelstadion, Mattersburg on 16 May 2009.

The competition was won by Austria Vienna after beating Trenkwalder Admira 3–1 after extra time. It was the 27th Austrian Cup title for the team from Vienna, who also qualified for the third qualifying round of the 2009–10 UEFA Europa League in the process.

Preliminary round
The Preliminary Round involved 58 amateur clubs from all regional federations, divided into smaller groups according to the Austrian federal states. Twenty-nine games were played between July 18 and August 3, 2008, with the winners advancing to the first round.

|-
|colspan="3" style="background-color:#fcc;"|

|-
|colspan="3" style="background-color:#fcc;"|

|-
|colspan="3" style="background-color:#fcc;"|

|-
|colspan="3" style="background-color:#fcc;"|

|-
|colspan="3" style="background-color:#fcc;"|

|-
|colspan="3" style="background-color:#fcc;"|

|-
|colspan="3" style="background-color:#fcc;"|

|-
|colspan="3" style="background-color:#fcc;"|

|-
|colspan="3" style="background-color:#fcc;"|

|}

First round
In this round entered, together with the winners from the previous round, all twenty-two clubs from the Bundesliga and the First League, as well as the nine regional cup winners. The draw for this round was conducted on August 4, 2008. The games were played on August 14 – 17, 2008.

|-
|colspan="3" style="background-color:#fcc;"|

|-
|colspan="3" style="background-color:#fcc;"|

|-
|colspan="3" style="background-color:#fcc;"|

|-
|colspan="3" style="background-color:#fcc;"|

|}

Second round
The draw of the second round was conducted on August 19, 2008. The games were played on September 12 and 13, 2008.

|-
|colspan="3" style="background-color:#fcc;"|

|-
|colspan="3" style="background-color:#fcc;"|

|}

Third round
The winners of last year's competition, SV Horn, entered in this round. The draw for this round was conducted on September 14, 2008. The games were played on October 28 and 29, 2008.

|-
|colspan="3" style="background-color:#fcc;"|

|-
|colspan="3" style="background-color:#fcc;"|

|}

Quarter-finals
The draw for this round was conducted on November 9, 2008.

Semi-finals
The draw for this round was conducted on 8 March 2009.

Final

See also
 2008–09 Austrian Football Bundesliga
 2008–09 Austrian First League

External links
 Official website 
 Austriasoccer.at page

References

Austrian Cup seasons
Cup
Austrian Cup, 2008-09